The Dharla River is a tributary of Brahmaputra which is a trans-boundary river flowing through India, Bhutan  and Bangladesh. It originates from Kupup/Bitang lake lying in Pangolakha Wildlife Sanctuary of East Sikkim in Himalayas where it is known as the Jaldhaka River, and then it flows through East Sikkim, India than goes to  Samtse District, Bhutan and comes back to India again at  Kalimpong district than it flows through Jalpaiguri and Cooch Behar districts of West Bengal, India, one of the seven main rivers to do so. Here the river enters Bangladesh through the  Lalmonirhat District and flows as the Dharla River until it empties into the Brahmaputra River near the Kurigram District. Near Patgram Upazila, it again flows easterly back into India. It then moves south and enters Bangladesh again through Phulbari Upazila of Kurigram District and continues a slow meandering course.

Erosion by the rivers Dharla and Jamuna took a serious turn in Lalmonirhat in 2007.
Three mosques, two temples, a madrassah and a primary school, and a vast tract of cultivable land with crops were devoured by the river, rendering about three thousand people homeless.

There is a park beside the Dharla at Kurigram. There also is a bridge. The river is full during the monsoon season but has only knee-deep water in summer. Deposition of silt has led to the formation of many small islands (chars) in the river.

Floods
River Dharla, along with River Teesta have created major flooding multiple times in Bangladesh during monsoon season between June to September.

References

Rivers of Bangladesh
Rivers of West Bengal
International rivers of Asia
Rivers of Sikkim
Rivers of India
Rivers of Rangpur Division
Rivers of Kalimpong district
Tributaries of the Brahmaputra River